The 2003–04 Toto Cup Al was the 20th season of the third most important football tournament in Israel since its introduction. This was the 5th and final edition to be played with clubs of both Israeli Permier League and Liga Leumit clubs.

The competition began on 8 August 2003 and ended on 20 May 2003, with Maccabi Petah Tikva beating Maccabi Haifa 3–0 in the final.

Format change
The 24 Israeli Permier League and Liga Leumit clubs were divided into six groups, each with four clubs, with the six group winners, along with the two best runners-up, advancing to the quarter-finals.

Group stage
The matches were played from 8 August 2003 to 29 October 2003.

Group A

Group B

Group C

Group D

Group E

Group F

Knockout rounds

Quarter-finals

Semifinals

Final

See also
 2003–04 Toto Cup Artzit

References

External links
 Israel Cups 2003/04 RSSSF
 Toto Cup 03-04  One.co.il 

Al
Toto Cup Al
Toto Cup Al